Cerro Catedral Heliport  is a public use heliport located near Cerro Catedral, Chubut, Argentina.

See also
List of airports in Argentina

References

External links 
 Airport record for Cerro Catedral Heliport at Landings.com

Airports in Chubut Province
Heliports